Virgil Meneghello Dinčić (1876–1944) was a Croatian  painter and art teacher. He is best known as a member of the school of Split caricaturists, but also painted scenes of Croatian life.

Life
Dinčić was born 19 March 1876 in Split. He was an active member of the Split literary and artistic club, together with Emanuel Vidović, Josip Lalić, and Ante Katunarić. With Katunarić, he contributed to Duje Balavac, a popular magazine known for its social and political satire. His pupils included painter Marino Tartaglia.

Dinčić exhibited his works as a part of Kingdom of Serbia's pavilion at International Exhibition of Art of 1911.

Gallery

References

External links
Digital versions of Duje Balavac

1876 births
1944 deaths
19th-century Croatian painters
20th-century Croatian painters
Croatian male painters
19th-century Croatian male artists
20th-century Croatian male artists